Isaac Edward Salkinsohn (1820 - June 5, 1883), (Yitzhak Salkinsohn), was a Lithuanian Jew who converted to Christianity, and lived during the Jewish Enlightenment. He was a famous translator into Hebrew. He was noted for his loyalty to the original text, while preserving the spirit of the Hebrew language, which he characterized as a biblical and liturgical language.

Salkinsohn was born as a Jew in the town of Shkloŭ, in Belarus, in 1820. His father was a scholar, well known throughout the area, even though he was not a rabbi. When Salkinsohn was still a small child, his mother died and his father remarried. Salkinsohn, who was the youngest of his mother’s children, suffered greatly under his new stepmother, but was very close with his father. At the age of 17, he left his father and decided to run away to Mahilyow. After news of an impending army conscription he moved to a nearby village, in the house of the barkeeper. In the village he became friendly with the hazzan and helped him deal with religious issues. While there, an interest in secular studies and general enlightenment was kindled in Salkinsohn. Meanwhile, the barkeeper planned to marry his granddaughter to Salkinsohn. When Salkinsohn learned of this, he revealed it to the hazzan, who helped him sneak away and get to Vilnius, then called Vilna.

In Vilna Salkinsohn met the Eliashevitz family, and with the father’s influence studied Hebrew grammar and German, and became a great scholar. While studying in Vilna, he caught the eye of the Eliashevitz daughter, and translated his first translation. Already in this translation, the first act of Schiller’s Kabale und Liebe (translated into Hebrew as ‘’Nechelim veAhavim’’), his talent was apparent. However, as the Eliashevitz daughter did not return his courtship, he left her house and began wandering. He was planning to arrive in Germany and resume his studies, but for unclear reasons changed his course and decided to go to London.

In London Salkinsohn met Christian missionaries and converted in 1849. He was appointed a Presbyterian pastor in 1856 (some say 1859) and began working as a missionary in 1864. In 1876 he was sent as a missionary to Vienna and preached in the Anglican church there. He also began working in earnest on his translations, and frequented the salons popular at the time. There he met Peretz Smolenskin, the well known intellectual and editor of the Hebrew periodical ‘’The Dawn’’. Smolenskin, after he realized Salkinsohn’s considerable talent for translation, encouraged him to translate the world’s great literature into Hebrew.

Salkinsohn represented two opposite sides for educated Jewry of the period. On one hand, he was making the great Western novels accessible to most Jews, and was a beautiful translator, but on the other hand, he had converted and was encouraging them to do the same. He had his share of enemies: not only did people warn against him and released slander against him, but there also were many who egged others on against his friend, Peretz Smolenskin. For many Jews of the period, even though they enjoyed his translations, it was hard to praise a Jew who had converted to Christianity, and one who translated not only literary works, but undoubtedly Christian works.

Six years after he reached Vienna, on June 5, 1883, Isaac Salkinsohn died, aged 63.

His most famous translations:
1871 - John Milton's Paradise Lost as Vaygaresh et ha-adam ("And He drove the man out", a phrase from Genesis 3:24).
 The New Testament, published posthumously in 1886, although his translation is now difficult to find, as the one by Franz Delitzsch is more prevalent.
 Two works by William Shakespeare: 1874 - Othello as Ithi'el ha-Kushi, and in 1878 - Romeo and Juliet as Ram ve-Ya'el.

Sources 
 This article uses translated material from the equivalent Hebrew-language Wikipedia article (retrieved March 22, 2005). Both articles are licensed under the GNU Free Documentation License.
 Encyclopaedia Judaica, 1972, Keter Publishing House, Jerusalem, Israel.

External links 
 Salkinsohn, Isaac Edward in the 1906 Jewish Encyclopedia

1820 births
1883 deaths
People from Shklow
Belarusian Jews
Belarusian Presbyterians
Belarusian translators
Translators of the New Testament into Hebrew
Converts to Calvinism from Judaism
Lithuanian Jews
19th-century translators
Jewish translators of the Bible